Everyday carry (EDC) or every-day carry is a collection of useful items that are consistently carried on person every day. The main reasons for having EDC are utility (usefulness), self-sufficiency, and preparedness: to help individuals improve simple everyday problem solving, from the mundane (opening packages, minor repairs) to possible emergency situations such as first aid or self-defense. Some of the most common EDC items are watches, pens, wallets, car and home key rings, mobile phones, flashlights, multi-tools, tissues, medications, and personal care items.

The choice and priority/ranking of which items to carry, and how or where to carry them, vary according to each person's needs depending on their occupation, avocations, lifestyle, and similar factors of everyday life. Goals include being able to solve everyday problems more efficiently and to be an asset instead of a liability or helpless bystander when a problem arises.

While often distributed among pockets in everyday clothing, carry options are frequently expanded by the addition of clothing accessories like a fanny pack, purse, small daypack, sunglasses, bracelets, or even footwear like long boots or a vest with pockets. How EDC items are stored, though, depends on the purpose and intentions for their use. 

The optimization of everyday carry (kit/layouts and carry modes) has become an internet subculture, but the basic concepts are useful to everyone. Designing and revising one's EDC does not have to be a hobby in itself, although it can become one for EDC enthusiasts. When it does, it overlaps with collecting, as many EDC enthusiasts are drawn into collecting EDC items in the quest for finding which one works best for their current EDC needs (or a set of scenarios, such as a light-duty day, a heavy-duty day, a weekend day versus a work day, and so on). The collecting of tools takes on an art appreciation component as fans appreciate the design cues, material choices, and craftsmanship that went into each model of tool, including trade-offs of costs versus benefits for each aspect of it. "The best tool is the one that you have on you when you need one," is a common aphorism which argues against excessive optimization of the tools carried, due to diminishing returns.

See also
 Civil defense
 Survival kit
 Emergency management
 Military surplus
 Mini survival kit
 Self-preservation
 Survivalism

References

External links

 An Introduction to Everyday Carry
 What Are EDC Essentials – The Must Have List For Everyday Carry
 Every Day Carry Guide, Tips, and Checklist
 7 Real-Life Examples of EDC Kits

Incident management
Self-defense